Novo Selište   is a village in Croatia. It is connected by the D37 highway.

Populated places in Sisak-Moslavina County